Francisco Muñoz Sánchez (born 13 March 1970 in Valencia) is a B1 goalball athlete from Spain.  He played goalball at the 1996 Summer Paralympics. His team was third.

References

External links 
 
 

1972 births
Living people
Paralympic bronze medalists for Spain
Paralympic goalball players of Spain
Paralympic medalists in goalball
Goalball players at the 1996 Summer Paralympics
Medalists at the 1996 Summer Paralympics
Sportspeople from Valencia